Mikal may refer to:

Mikal, Gilan, Iran
Mikal (given name), includes a list of people with the name